Zoël Saindon (October 18, 1919 – October 29, 1998) was a Canadian provincial politician. He was the Liberal member of the National Assembly of Quebec for Argenteuil from 1966 to 1978. He was also mayor of Lachute from 1964 to 1975.

References

1919 births
1998 deaths
Mayors of places in Quebec
People from Edmundston
People from Lachute
Quebec Liberal Party MNAs